Marisa River is a river in the province of Gorontalo, island of Sulawesi, Indonesia, about 1800 km northeast of the capital Jakarta.

Geography 
The river flows in the northern area of Sulawesi island with predominantly tropical rainforest climate (designated as Af in the Köppen-Geiger climate classification). The annual average temperature in the area is 23 °C. The warmest month is October, when the average temperature is around 26 °C, and the coldest is February, at 21 °C. The average annual rainfall is 2133 mm. The wettest month is July, with an average of 270 mm rainfall, and the driest is September, with 53 mm rainfall.

See also
List of rivers of Indonesia
List of rivers of Sulawesi

References

Rivers of Gorontalo (province)
Rivers of Indonesia